Command Airways   was a United States regional airline based at the Dutchess County Airport in Wappinger, New York, just outside Poughkeepsie, which was operational from 1966 to 1988.

History
The airline was founded by Kingsley G. Morse (1931–1993), who was the airline's sole CEO during its entire existence.

The company was established as Mid-Hudson Airlines in 1951. At its peak in 1988, Command Airways had 538 employees and 15 aircraft serving 13 airports.
 
In 1984 it began transitioning into operating in affiliation with American Airlines, much like AmericanConnection did.  By maintaining independent management and separate ownership,  it continued to do business  in its own colors as Command Airways, although its fleet was primarily dedicated for American Airlines operations.  This permitted Command to gain marketing presence associated only usually with much larger airline carriers.

Command was one of the first regional airlines to carry the American Eagle brand when it became a part of the American Eagle system which included repainting their entire fleet under the American Eagle banner.  This rebranding  process of regional airlines commenced circa 1985 and accelerated when American Airlines parent company began purchasing a number of smaller regional carriers after the bankruptcy (December 1987) of one of its affiliate partners named AVAir, which was operating similarly to Command Airways.

AMR Corporation the parent company of American Airlines, purchased Command Airways in 1988 and renamed it AMR Eagle/Command Airways. This and other AMR affiliate and subsidiary airlines and Flagship Airlines flew under the American Eagle banner before all parties began being referred to more simply as American Eagle in 1991.

AMR Eagle/Command Airways was operated separately until all AMR subsidiary regional carriers excluding Executive Airlines were merged into AMR Simmons Airlines, in late 1998. The new company formed from Simmons Airlines was called American Eagle Airlines  (utilizing the former Simmons Airlines two letter IATA Code "MQ").

During its existence, Command Airways operated the Beech 99, de Havilland Canada DHC-6 Twin Otter, Short 330, Short 360-300 and ATR-42 turboprop airliners.  Command was the first U.S. airline to operate both the Short 330  starting in 1976 and the ATR-42 beginning in 1986.

Its hub was at the Dutchess County Airport near Poughkeepsie, which CEO Kingsley Morse strongly supported in the 1970s, in preference to Stewart Airport west of Newburgh. Dutchess County Airport no longer has scheduled commercial airline service.

Destinations

New York
Poughkeepsie (Dutchess County Airport)* Hub
Albany (Albany International Airport)
Binghamton (Broome County Airport)
Ithaca (Tompkins County Airport)
New York (John F. Kennedy International Airport)
New York (LaGuardia Airport)
White Plains (Westchester County Airport)
Massachusetts
Boston (Logan International Airport)
Pittsfield (Pittsfield Municipal Airport)*
New Hampshire
Lebanon (Lebanon Municipal Airport)
Vermont
Burlington (Burlington International Airport)
Virginia
Manassas (Manassas Regional Airport)*

 Those articles marked with an asterisk (*) are no longer served by commercial airline service.

See also 
 List of defunct airlines of the United States

References

Defunct airlines of the United States
Defunct companies based in New York (state)
Dutchess County, New York
Airlines established in 1966
Airlines disestablished in 1988
1966 establishments in New York (state)